John Pellew (17 July 1882 – 17 October 1946) was an Australian cricketer. He played in twenty-one first-class matches for South Australia between 1903 and 1909.

See also
 List of South Australian representative cricketers

References

External links
 

1882 births
1946 deaths
Australian cricketers
South Australia cricketers
Cricketers from Adelaide